CSS St. Patrick, a submersible torpedo boat which could "be sunk and raised as desired," was built privately at Mobile, Alabama, by John P. Halligan in 1864. She was transferred to the Confederate States Army on 24 January 1865, but placed under the command of Lt. J. T. Walker, CSN. An hour after midnight on 28 January this little vessel struck the Federal ship USS Octorara abaft her wheelhouse with a torpedo which misfired and did no damage. When the Federals returned artillery and musket fire St. Patrick escaped to the protection of the Confederate batteries at Mobile.

References 

Torpedo boats of the Confederate States Navy
Naval ships of the Confederate States of America
Ships of the Confederate States Navy